Bakri Tarab (born 20 January 1985 in Aleppo, Syria) is a Syrian football player who is currently playing for Al Masafi in the Iraqi Premier League.

Honour and Titles

National Team
Nehru Cup:
Runner-up (1): 2009

External links

1985 births
Living people
Syrian footballers
Syria international footballers
Association football defenders
Al-Ittihad Aleppo players
Association football midfielders
Syrian expatriate footballers
Expatriate footballers in Iraq
Syrian expatriate sportspeople in Iraq
Sportspeople from Aleppo
Taliya SC players
Footballers at the 2006 Asian Games
Asian Games competitors for Syria
Syrian Premier League players
People from Aleppo